Acidiella contraria is a species of tephritid or fruit flies in the genus Acidiella of the family Tephritidae.

References

Trypetinae